Annaram is a census town in Medak district of the Indian state of Telangana.

Economy 
Its economy mainly depends on primary sectors of agriculture, cattle. It has Schneider Electric manufacturing industry warehouses, cycle assembling units and a few small-scale industries.

References 

Towns in Medak district